In chemical engineering, a cascade is a plant consisting of several similar stages with each processing the output from the previous stage. Cascades are most commonly used in isotope separation, distillation, flotation and other separation or purification processes.

Cascade process
Cascade process is any process that takes place in a number of steps, usually because the single step is too inefficient to produce the desired result. For example, in some uranium-enrichment processes the separation of the desired isotope is only poorly achieved in a single stage; to achieve better separation the process has to be repeated a number of times, in a series, with the enriched fraction of one stage being fed  to the succeeding stage for further enrichment. Another example of cascade process is that operating in a cascade liquefier.

Examples
If a still removes 99% of impurities from water (leaving .01 the original amount of impurities), a cascade of three stills will leave (1-0.99)3 = 0.000001 = 0.0001% the amount of impurities (99.9999% removed).

References

Chemical process engineering